Vinay is an Indian name typically meaning guidance, good behaviour, genuinity,  politeness, modesty and smart in Sanskrit. It has its origins in  the Sanskrit language, and is of Indo-Aryan / Indo-European origin. Most Indian languages spell and pronounce the name as is in Sanskrit but in a few other languages such as Bengali and Odiya, changes either in spelling or pronunciation or both occur. For example, it may be used as, Binay in Bengali-speaking and Odia- speaking regions. Feminine form of the name is Vinaya or Vinayaa. Binay is also a surname popular in Philippines.

Vinay may refer to:

People

Academics
Vinay V. Deodhar, a professor of mathematics at Indiana University
Vinay Kumar (pathologist), Professor of Pathology at the University of Chicago
Vinay Kumar Pathak, Indian academic
Vinay Lal, Indian historian

Arts and entertainment
Vinay Anand, Indian actor
Vinay Apte, Indian actor
Vinay Chandra Maudgalya, Indian classical musician
Vinay Forrt, Indian actor
Vinay Govind, Indian film director
Vinay Pathak, Indian actor
Vinay Rai, Indian actor
Vinay Rajkumar, Indian actor
Vinay Rohrra, Indian actor
Vinay Saynekar, Indian type designer, calligrapher 
Vinay Shukla, Indian film writer and director
Winai Kraibutr, Thai actor

Business
Vinay Maloo, Indian businessman, chairman of Enso Group
Vinay Nair, American investor
Vinay Nadkarni, Indian banker

Politics and government
Vinay Bhaskar, Indian politician
Vinay Katiyar, Indian politician 
Vinay Kore, Indian politician
Vinay Kumar Pandey, Indian politician
Vinay Kumar Sorake, Indian politician
Vinay Sahasrabuddhe, Indian politician
Winai Senniam, Thai politician

Science and technology
Vinay Prasad, American hematologist-oncologist
Winai Dahlan, Thai Scientist

Sports
Vinay Bhat, American chess Grandmaster
Vinay Kumar, Indian cricketer
Vinay Singh, Indian footballer

Others
21644 Vinay, a main belt asteroid with an orbital period of 1370.4239593 days (3.75 years)
Jean-Baptiste-Maximien Parchappe de Vinay, French psychiatrist
Ranvir Vinay Aur Kaun?, Indian Hindi talk show
Vinay, Isère, commune in the Isère department in southeastern France
Vinay, Marne, commune in the Marne department in north-eastern France

Indian masculine given names